The Phyllophorinae is a subfamily of the bush crickets or katydids, found in east Malesia to Australia (with a record from Sri Lanka).

Genera 
The Orthoptera Species File lists the following:
 Hyperhomala Serville, 1831
 Microsasima: M. stueberi de Jong, 1972
 Parasasima: P. elegans Willemse, 1955
 Phyllophora Thunberg, 1815
 Phyllophorella Karny, 1924
 Phyllophorina Karny, 1924
 Sasima Bolívar, 1903
 Sasimella Karny, 1924
 Sasimoides Karny, 1924 S. spinosissima Karny, 1924
 Siliquofera Bolívar, 1903 S. grandis (Blanchard, 1853)
 Siliquoferella: S.emarginata Karny, 1924

References

External links
 

Tettigoniidae
Orthoptera subfamilies
Orthoptera of Asia
Orthoptera of Australia